Ali Reza Kooshki (born 16 February 2000) is an Iranian footballer who plays as a midfielder for Persian Gulf Pro League side Foolad.

Career statistics

Club

Notes

Honours
Foolad
Iranian Super Cup: 2021

References

External links

2000 births
Living people
Iranian footballers
Persian Gulf Pro League players
Naft va Gaz Gachsaran F.C. players
Sepidrood Rasht players
Paykan F.C. players
Association football midfielders
Foolad FC players
People from Kohgiluyeh and Boyer-Ahmad Province

Alireza Koushki at PersianLeague.com